Daniel da Mota Alves (born 11 September 1985) is a Luxembourger footballer who plays for Etzella Ettelbruck.

Club career
Da Mota finished the 2005–06 season of the Luxembourg National Division as the joint-sixth top goalscorer, and the second-best placed Luxembourgian footballer.

The following season, da Mota scored 24 goals (fully 40% of all of second-placed Ettelbruck's goals), finishing as the league's top goalscorer. In July 2008, he left FC Etzella Ettelbruck and moved for 65,000 Euro to F91 Dudelange.

International career
Born in Luxembourg to Portuguese parents, Da Mota took up Luxembourgish citizenship in January 2007 and made his debut for Luxembourg in a June 2007 European Championship qualification match against Albania. His first two international goals helped Luxembourg defeat Slovakia by a score of 2–1 on 9 February 2011. He scored his second international goal on 7 September 2012 in a World Cup qualifier against Portugal in a 2–1 defeat. On 2 June 2021, he played his 100th match for Luxembourg in a friendly match against Norway.

Criminal Conviction
Daniel da Mota was prosecuted for having taken advantage of the weakened state of an octogenarian. The court sentenced him to two years in prison with a suspended sentence and a fine of 5,000 euros. He has the obligation to compensate the civil party up to 150,500 euros.

Honours
F91 Dudelange
 Luxembourg National Division (6): 2008–09, 2010–11, 2011–12, 2013–14, 2015–16, 2016–17
 Luxembourg Cup (4): 2008–09, 2011–12, 2015–16, 2016–17

Individual
 Luxembourg National Division top scorer: 2006–07
 Luxembourgish Footballer of the Year: 2010–11

See also
 List of men's footballers with 100 or more international caps

References

External links
 Roster – F91 Dudelange
 
 

1985 births
Living people
People from Ettelbruck
Luxembourgian people of Portuguese descent
Luxembourgian footballers
FC Etzella Ettelbruck players
F91 Dudelange players
Luxembourg international footballers
Association football forwards
FIFA Century Club